Michele DeJuliis was appointed as the commissioner of the inaugural United Women's Lacrosse League in 2015, holding the position until December 2016. On May 23, 2013, DeJuliis was elected to the US National Lacrosse Hall of Fame. and captured a gold medal with the United States women's national lacrosse team at the 2009 Women's Lacrosse World Cup.

Career
Gaining All-America honors as a member of the Penn State Nittany Lions women's lacrosse team, she would amass 142 goals and 203 career points. 
 
Of note, she was part of the US national team program since 1994.  A former member of the United States national team, DeJuliis captured a gold medal at the 2009 Federation of International Lacrosse Women's Lacrosse World Cup.
 
In January 2001, she was the founder of The Ultimate Goal Lacrosse Club. DeJuliis would join the Princeton Tigers women's lacrosse program during the 2004–05 season in a role as offensive coordinator.

Law enforcement
DeJuliis was a former member of the Baltimore Police Department from 1999 to 2004. During her time, she earned  Meritorious Conduct Award and the Police Commissioner's Award of Excellence.

Awards and honors
1992 Baltimore Sun's Metro Player of the Year 
1997 Aimee Willard Award (presented to the outstanding college player at the National Tournament) 
Three-time IWLCA All-America (1995, 1996, 1997)
Greater Baltimore Chapter of the US Lacrosse Hall of Fame (2008)
2009 Beth Allen Award (presented to a member of the US Lacrosse Women's Division )
2013 inductee to the US National Lacrosse Hall of Fame.

References

Living people
American lacrosse players
Baltimore Police Department officers
Penn State Nittany Lions women's lacrosse players
Princeton Tigers women's lacrosse coaches
Lacrosse players from Baltimore
Year of birth missing (living people)